Jürgen Romano Colin (born 20 January 1981) is a Dutch former professional footballer who played as a central defender.

Club career
Born in Utrecht of Surinamese descent, Colin started his professional career at PSV Eindhoven – after arriving in the club's youth system at the age of seven – having signed from amateurs HMS. His debut came on 22 August 2001 in a 3–2 home win against FC Den Bosch, and he went on to play three more matches before he was sent on loan to K.R.C. Genk, with whom he won the 2001–02 edition of the Belgian Pro League.

The following season Colin was sent on loan again, to NAC Breda, for which he played every game during the campaign. He returned to PSV for 2003–04 and became a full squad member, making 20 league appearances. The following season he was loaned once again to NAC. His solid performances in 2004–05 earned him a transfer to Football League Championship's Norwich City. Believed to be worth £263,000 or 300,000 euro from PSV.

Colin had a difficult first year at Norwich and struggled for form, eventually losing his place at right back to Craig Fleming. He was re-instated to the team at the start of the 2006–07 season and ultimately retained his status; however, when new club manager Peter Grant took over, he lost his place to versatile midfielder Andy Hughes.

In early July 2007, Colin was invited to a three-week trial with Eredivisie giants AFC Ajax. On the 30th the move was finalised for a fee of €100,000, and made his official debut for the Amsterdam team in the Supercup 1–0 defeat of former club PSV, winning his second career trophy.

However, after having appeared sparingly during the campaign, Colin moved to La Liga team Sporting de Gijón in August 2008, signing a one-year link. Beginning the season in the starting XI, he was dropped after a 1–7 thrashing at Real Madrid and never appeared officially again.

On 25 August 2009, Colin moved for free to RKC Waalwijk also in the Netherlands' top level. After only one full season, which ended in relegation, he moved abroad again, signing for Cypriot First Division side Anorthosis Famagusta FC; on 9 February 2012, he extended his contract at the latter until 2015.

32-year-old Colin moved to Hapoel Tel Aviv F.C. on a two-year deal on 2 June 2013, joining the Israelis with teammate Branko Ilič.

International career
Colin represented the Netherlands the 2001 FIFA World Youth Championship, scoring one goal in an eventual group stage exit in Argentina.

Club statistics

Honours
Genk 
Belgian Pro League: 2001–02

PSV
Johan Cruijff Shield: 2003

Ajax
Johan Cruijff Shield: 2007

RKC Waalwijk:
Eerste Divisie: 2010–11

Hapoel Ashkelon
Toto Cup: 2015–16

References

External links
Stats at Voetbal International 

1981 births
Living people
Dutch sportspeople of Surinamese descent
Footballers from Utrecht (city)
Dutch footballers
Association football defenders
Eredivisie players
Eerste Divisie players
PSV Eindhoven players
NAC Breda players
AFC Ajax players
RKC Waalwijk players
Belgian Pro League players
K.R.C. Genk players
English Football League players
Norwich City F.C. players
La Liga players
Sporting de Gijón players
Cypriot First Division players
Anorthosis Famagusta F.C. players
Israeli Premier League players
Liga Leumit players
Hapoel Tel Aviv F.C. players
Hapoel Ashkelon F.C. players
Erovnuli Liga players
FC Torpedo Kutaisi players
Netherlands youth international footballers
Dutch expatriate footballers
Expatriate footballers in Belgium
Expatriate footballers in England
Expatriate footballers in Spain
Expatriate footballers in Cyprus
Expatriate footballers in Israel
Expatriate footballers in Georgia (country)
Dutch expatriate sportspeople in Belgium
Dutch expatriate sportspeople in England
Dutch expatriate sportspeople in Spain
Dutch expatriate sportspeople in Cyprus
Dutch expatriate sportspeople in Israel
Dutch expatriate sportspeople in Georgia (country)